Seda Yörükler (born 28 May 1984 in Bornova, Izmir) is a Turkish female handballer playing in left back position.

Yörükler is playing for İzmir Büyükşehir Belediyespor since 2000.

Achievements

National
 2007–08 İzmir Büyükşehir Belediyespor TWHSL 
 2010–11 İzmir Büyükşehir Belediyespor TWHSL 

Legend:
 TWHSL Turkish Women's Handball Super League

References 

1984 births
People from Bornova
Living people
Sportspeople from İzmir
Turkish female handball players
İzmir Büyükşehir Belediyespor handball players
Turkey women's national handball players
21st-century Turkish women